Freitag is the German word for Friday. Freitag or Freytag may refer to:

People
 Amanda Freitag (born 1972), Food Network Chef
 Arny Freytag (born 1950), American photographer
 Barbara Freitag (born 1941), a German-born Brazilian sociologist and author
 Bernd von Freytag-Loringhoven (1914–2007), Baltic German general
 Dagmar Freitag (born 1953), German politician
 Elsa von Freytag-Loringhoven (1874–1927), Dada-artist
 Herta Freitag (1908–2000), Austrian-American mathematician
 Holger Freitag (born 1963), German ski jumper
 Georg Wilhelm Friedrich Freytag (1788–1861), German philologist
 Gustav Freytag (1816–1895), German dramatist
Freytag's pyramid
 Jacques Freitag (born 1982), South African high jumper
 John Freitag (1877–1932), American rower
 Lori Freitag, American applied mathematician and computer scientist
 Meike Freitag (born 1979), German freestyle swimmer
 Richard Freitag (born 1991), German ski jumper
 Willy Freitag (fl. 1960s), former U.S. soccer defender
 Freytag, a surname

Other uses
 Freitag, der 13. (Friday the Thirteenth), a 1949 West German film
 Der Freitag, a German weekly newspaper published in Berlin
 Freitag aus Licht, the fifth opera of Karlheinz Stockhausen's Licht cycle
 Freitag Homestead, a historic farm in Washington, Green County, Wisconsin, U.S.

See also
 Wessel von Freytag-Loringhoven (1899-1944), Baltic German member of the resistance against Adolf Hitler

Surnames from nicknames